Joachim Ruhuna (October 27, 1933 – September 9, 1996) was a Burundian Roman Catholic prelate who served as Archbishop of Gitega from 1983 until his murder by a gang of armed men in 1996.

Notes 

1933 births
1996 deaths
Roman Catholic archbishops of Gitega
Assassinated Burundian people
Assassinated religious leaders